Bernard Adam Ptak (born 9 August 1954 in Mościszki) is a Polish politician. He was elected to the Sejm on 25 September 2005, getting 7023 votes in 36 Kalisz district as a candidate from the Self-Defence of the Republic of Poland list.

See also
Members of Polish Sejm 2005-2007

External links
Bernard Ptak - parliamentary page - includes declarations of interest, voting record, and transcripts of speeches.

1954 births
Living people
People from Kościan County
Polish United Workers' Party members
Self-Defence of the Republic of Poland politicians
Law and Justice politicians
Members of the Polish Sejm 2005–2007